North Station is a Canadian children's comedy film, directed by Jean-Claude Lord and released in 2002.

The film is set in the town of North Station, where children's letters to Santa Claus (Benoît Brière) were delivered for many years and answered by a local family; after the death of his grandfather, Samuel (Xavier Morin-Lefort) and his girlfriend Évelyne (Roxanne Gaudette-Loiseau) decide to carry on the tradition, but Samuel goes missing and is presumed dead after trying to deliver the letters in a snowstorm, when in fact he has been saved and taken to Santa's workshop at the North Pole. When a letter arrives fifty years later from Satia, the granddaughter of Évelyne (Renée Claude), requesting Santa's help in curing Évelyne of cancer, Samuel becomes motivated to go out to reunite with his lost love.

The cast also includes Lansana Kourouma, Catherine Florent, Genevieve Déry, Nathalie Simard, Gaston Lepage and Louis-Georges Girard.

The film was released in theatres on November 11, 2002.

The film received a Jutra Award nomination for Best Art Direction at the 5th Jutra Awards in 2003.

References

External links 

2002 films
2002 romantic comedy films
Canadian children's comedy films
Canadian romantic comedy films
Canadian Christmas comedy films
Films directed by Jean-Claude Lord
French-language Canadian films
2000s Canadian films